Manjal Veiyil is a 2009 Tamil language film directed by Vaseegaran, starring Prasanna, Sandhya, R. K., and Bala. The music was composed by Bharadwaj, and the film released on 12 June 2009.

Plot

The movie deals with two best friends, Gayathri and Vijay. The conflict arises when in Gayathri's sister Savitri's wedding, the groom gets attracted towards Gayathri and vows to marry her instead of Savitri.

Cast
Prasanna as Vijay
Sandhya as Gayathri
R. K. as Rajesh
Bala as Ravi
Nizhalgal Ravi as Gayathri's father
M. S. Bhaskar
Tharika
Thalapathy Dinesh
Sriranjini as Gayathri's mother
Cool Suresh

Soundtrack
Soundtrack was composed by Bharadwaj and lyrics written by Pa. Vijay. The album received negative reviews from critics.

Critical reception
Behindwoods wrote "Manjal Veyil is about friendship and love, but it is hard to fall in love with this movie. There are too many pitfalls, enough to negate the universal appeal of the subject. Vaseegaran could have come up with a more pleasing account of two of the most wonderful emotions." The Hindu wrote "A decent film, no doubt, but is it the only criterion for a film to be worth a watch? The narration needs to be lucid, the story, plausible, the cast, suitable and the performances laudable. ‘Manjal Veyil’ has just about a little of everything." Rediff wrote "Vaseegaran has obviously come in with honourable intentions -- but the screenplay simply doesn't hold water."

References

2009 films
2000s Tamil-language films